Neogriphoneura is a genus of flies in the family Lauxaniidae. There are about 11 described species in Neogriphoneura.

Species
These 11 species belong to the genus Neogriphoneura:
N. bispoi Mello & Silva, 2008
N. corrugata Mello & Silva, 2008
N. immaculata Hendel, 1933
N. laevifrons Hendel, 1925
N. pacata Mello & Silva, 2008
N. schnusei Hendel, 1925
N. sordida (Wiedemann, 1830)
N. striatifrons Hendel, 1932
N. striga Curran, 1942
N. tertia Curran, 1942
N. timida Curran, 1942

References

Further reading

External links

 

Lauxaniidae
Articles created by Qbugbot
Lauxanioidea genera